Helluonini is a tribe of flat-horned ground beetles in the family Carabidae. There are at least 25 genera and around 200 species in Helluonini.

Genera
These 26 genera belong to the tribe Helluonini:

 Aenigma Newman, 1836
 Ametroglossus Sloane, 1914
 Colfax Andrewes, 1920
 Creagris Nietner, 1857
 Dailodontus Reiche, 1843
 Dicranoglossus Chaudoir, 1872
 Epimicodema Sloane, 1914
 Erephognathus Alluaud, 1932
 Gigadema Thomson, 1859
 Helluapterus Sloane, 1914
 Helluarchus Sloane, 1914
 Helluo Bonelli, 1813
 Helluobrochus Reichardt, 1974
 Helluodema Castelnau, 1867
 Helluomorpha Laporte de Castelnau, 1840
 Helluomorphoides Ball, 1951 (flat-horned ground beetles)
 Helluonidius Chaudoir, 1872
 Helluopapua Darlington, 1968
 Helluosoma Castelnau, 1867
 Macrocheilus Hope, 1838
 Meladroma Motschulsky, 1855
 Neohelluo Sloane, 1914
 Omphra Reiche, 1842
 Platyhelluo Baehr, 2005
 Triaenogenius Chaudoir, 1877
 † Pleuracanthus Gray in Griffith, 1832

References

Further reading

External links

 

Harpalinae
Articles created by Qbugbot